At least two ships of the French Navy have been named Ouragan:

 , a  launched in 1924 and scrapped in 1949
 , an  launched in 1963 and stricken in 2007

French Navy ship names